Rétromobile is an annual classic auto show held in February in the French city of Paris. First held in 1976, the show is hosted at the Paris expo Porte de Versailles, a convention centre located between the Boulevards of the Marshals and the Boulevard Périphérique. Traditionally the first major classic car show of the year. Rétromobile is also the location of a classic car auction.

References

External links
 Official website 

Auto shows in France
Annual events in Paris
1976 establishments in France
Recurring events established in 1976